Judy MacLeod is an American sports administrator and the current commissioner of Conference USA. She previously served as the athletic director at the University of Tulsa. MacLeod is the first woman to commission a conference in the NCAA Division I Football Bowl Subdivision (FBS).

Biography
MacLeod attended the University of Puget Sound as an undergraduate, where she played on the school's basketball team. After graduating, she spent four seasons as an assistant basketball coach at Seattle University. She also worked as a sports manager at the 1990 Goodwill Games, which inspired her to pursue a career in sports management. She became a graduate assistant at The University of Tulsa the same year. After working in various positions for the university's athletic department, she became its athletic director in 1995, a position she held for the next ten years. During MacLeod's tenure as athletic director, Tulsa built the Reynolds Center and several other new athletic facilities, and it moved its sports teams into the Western Athletic Conference and later into Conference USA.

In 2005, MacLeod left Tulsa to become an associate commissioner of Conference USA. She was promoted to executive associate commissioner the following year. While serving in that position, she was also a member of the NCAA Division I Men's Basketball Committee from 2012 to 2015. After Conference USA commissioner Britton Banowsky left his position in 2015, MacLeod was named the conference's new commissioner. She was the first and is so far the only woman to lead an FBS conference.

When MacLeod became commissioner, the conference had recently lost several teams to conference realignment, and its revenue from media rights had declined considerably. MacLeod signed several short-term contracts with streaming platforms to stabilize the conference's media revenue, but by 2019 the conference made $450,000 from its media rights, less than half of the $1.1 million it had made before realignment. After three schools left the American Athletic Conference in 2021, MacLeod proposed that Conference USA merge with the AAC and reorganize into two geographically compact conferences. The AAC rejected the proposal and instead invited six Conference USA schools to replace the three departing schools, sparking an exodus that left Conference USA with fewer than the required eight members needed to maintain its FBS status. C-USA would soon restore its membership to the needed level to maintain FBS status. First, four schools were announced as new members effective in 2023–24—FBS independents Liberty and New Mexico State (respectively full members of the ASUN Conference and WAC) and FCS upgraders Jacksonville State and Sam Houston. Another FCS upgrader, Kennesaw State, will join for 2024–25.

References

Living people
College athletic conference commissioners in the United States
Tulsa Golden Hurricane athletic directors
Puget Sound Loggers women's basketball players
Seattle Redhawks women's basketball coaches
Women in American professional sports management
Year of birth missing (living people)
21st-century American women